George R. Allin (January 15, 1880 – June 2, 1956) was an American brigadier general who served during World War I and World War II. He is most noted as commanding general of the Field Artillery School at Fort Sill, Oklahoma at the beginning of World War II.

Early life 
Allin was born in Scott Township, Johnson County, Iowa. He attended the University of Iowa and entered the United States Military Academy with the first contingent of senatorial appointments in 1900. While a cadet, he completed the requirements for a Bachelor of Philosophy degree at the University of Iowa in 1902. He was a cadet first sergeant and later became a cadet captain. He graduated number seventeen of one hundred and twenty-four in the class of 1904. Lesley J. McNair was among his classmates.

Career 
Allin was commissioned in the artillery and served several jobs throughout his career. During World War I, he was briefly stationed in France. Between World War I and II, Allin was a graduate from the School of the Line in 1922, the General Staff School in 1923 and the Army War College in 1924. He was an instructor at the United States Military Academy, executive officer for the first Chief of Artillery, temporary brigadier general during World War I, member of the War Department General Staff, Chief of Staff of a corps area, temporary brigadier general during World War II, and commandant of the Field Artillery School where he served from January 20, 1941 to June 30, 1942.

Allin retired in 1942 and was advanced from his permanent rank of colonel to brigadier general on the retired list. He then became superintendent of the Sewanee Military Academy in Sewanee, Tennessee. In 1948, he retired a second time.

Awards 
He received the Distinguished Service Medal in 1918 and Legion of Merit in 1942 for his service.

Death and legacy
George R. Allin died on June 2, 1956 at the age of seventy-six. Originally buried near his parents in Mason City, Iowa, his remains were reinterred at the West Point Cemetery on December 15, 1987 along with those of his wife Jessie Cooper (Pontius) Allin (1880–1963).

References 

Bibliography 
 Ancell, R. Manning, Miller Christine M, The Biographical Dictionary of World II Generals and Flag Officers. Westport, Ct: Greenwood. p.6 .
Armed Forces Journal International. Vol 85. Washington: Army and Navy Journal, inc., 1973.
Davis, Henry Blaine. Generals in Khaki. Raleigh, NC: Pentland Press, 1998.  
McKenney, Janice E. The Organizational History of Field Artillery 1775-2003. Washington, D.C.: Center of Military History, United States Army, 2006.

External links 

Generals of World War II

1880 births
1956 deaths
People from Johnson County, Iowa
University of Iowa alumni
United States Military Academy alumni
Military personnel from Iowa
United States Military Academy faculty
United States Army generals of World War I
Recipients of the Distinguished Service Medal (US Army)
United States Army Command and General Staff College alumni
United States Army War College alumni
United States Army generals of World War II
Recipients of the Legion of Merit
United States Army generals
Burials at West Point Cemetery